= Shobhapur Jahej =

- village
- Location within Madhya Pradesh Location within India
- Coordinates: 23.101297°N 77.433322°E
- Country: India
- State: Madhya Pradesh
- District: Bhopal
- Tehsil: Huzur

Population (2011)
  - Total: 402
- Time zone: UTC+5:30 (IST)
- ISO 3166 code: MP-IN
- Census code: 482536

Shobhapur Jahej is a village in the Bhopal district of Madhya Pradesh, India. It is located in the Huzur tehsil and the Phanda block.

== Demographics ==
According to the 2011 census of India, Shobhapur Jahej has 77 households. The effective literacy rate (i.e. the literacy rate of population excluding children aged 6 and below) is 75.84%.

Demographics (2011 Census)
| | Total | Male | Female |
|---|---|---|---|
| Population | 402 | 211 | 191 |
| Children aged below 6 years | 46 | 25 | 21 |
| Scheduled caste | 12 | 7 | 5 |
| Scheduled tribe | 11 | 7 | 4 |
| Literates | 270 | 159 | 111 |
| Workers (all) | 206 | 131 | 75 |
| Main workers (total) | 125 | 96 | 29 |
| Main workers: Cultivators | 49 | 36 | 13 |
| Main workers: Agricultural labourers | 34 | 22 | 12 |
| Main workers: Household industry workers | 0 | 0 | 0 |
| Main workers: Other | 42 | 38 | 4 |
| Marginal workers (total) | 81 | 35 | 46 |
| Marginal workers: Cultivators | 30 | 11 | 19 |
| Marginal workers: Agricultural labourers | 42 | 15 | 27 |
| Marginal workers: Household industry workers | 0 | 0 | 0 |
| Marginal workers: Others | 9 | 9 | 0 |
| Non-workers | 196 | 80 | 116 |
